is a Japanese actress and singer, best known to international audiences for her roles in the Luc Besson-produced Wasabi and the Academy Award-winning Japanese film Departures. She also starred in the 2008 comedy series Yasuko to Kenji.

Early life 
Hirosue was born in Yokohama, Kanagawa Prefecture and grew up on Kōchi city, Kōchi prefecture, Japan. She joined the "P&G" cosmetic model competition at age 14 and made her television debut the following year singing on the program, TK Music Camp. She made her television drama debut and is well known for her work as a spokesmodel for NTT DoCoMo. She studied at Waseda University but did not graduate.

Career

1995–2000 
Hirosue made her television debut in 1995 at age 15 in Fuji TV's Heart ni S.  She was also named "Best Newcomer" at the 10th Television Drama Academy Awards the same year when she starred in Fuji TV's comedy series Shota no Sushi. In 1997, she appeared in the finale of medical drama Hoshi no Kinka and the special episode of Odoru Daisousasen before making her breakthrough performance in Fuji TV's comedy series Beach Boys, where she was awarded "Best Supporting Actress" at the 14th Television Drama Academy Awards. Hirosue also made her film debut in the same year when she appeared in 20-seki Nostalgia which won her critical acclaim. She was awarded the Sponichi Grand Prize New Talent Award at the Mainichi Film Awards, Best New Talent at the Yokohama Film Festival and perhaps most importantly, the Newcomer of the Year award at the 21st Japanese Academy Awards.

In 1998, Hirosue reprised her role in the special episode of Beach Boys while also appearing in four other television dramas in the same year. In 1999, she returned to the big screen in Poppoya and Himitsu. Her performances in both films won her much praise from award-giving bodies of Japan and she received two nominations at the 23rd Japanese Academy Awards for Best Actress (for Himitsu) and Best Supporting Actress (for Poppoya). Her international profile also increased when she received the Best Actress prize for her performance in Himitsu at the 30th Sitges - Catalan International Film Festival.

She returned prominently to television in 2000 playing Yuki Katase in the drama Summer Snow, which won 5 awards at the 26th Television Drama Academy Awards including "Best Supporting Actress" and "Best Drama" before showing off her comedic chops in TBS's Oyaji. The latter role again won her "Best Supporting Actress" at the 27th awards ceremony.

2001–2005 
In 2001, Hirosue made her international film debut in the French Film Wasabi written by Luc Besson and directed by Gérard Krawczyk. Not being able to speak French for her role, she had to learn her lines phonetically. She also reunited for the fourth time on television with her frequent co-star Yutaka Takenouchi (they starred together in Long Vacation, Beach Boys and Seikimatsu no Uta) in Fuji TV's romantic comedy series Dekichatta Kekkon, starring as an expectant couple who did not know each other well before their one-night stand leading to the planning of a shotgun wedding. The series also starred Hiroshi Abe who won Best Supporting Actor at the 30th Television Drama Academy Awards.

In 2002, Hirosue appeared in the film Renai Shashin and the low-rated television drama Ai Nante Irane Yo, Natsu before capping the year in the family drama series Otousan. She reunited with her Summer Snow lead co-star, Tsuyoshi Dōmoto, in 2003's romance series Moto Kare. Her portrayal as the initially flippant ex-girlfriend, Makoto Saeki, won her "Best Supporting Actress" yet again at the 38th Television Drama Academy Awards.

Hirosue married model Takahiro Okazawa on 17 January 2004 and gave birth to her son on 10 April 2004. They later divorced in March 2008. Her marriage and new motherhood decreased her workload and she only made one appearance in 2004 in the film Hana and Alice and one appearance on 2005's Fuji TV's romance drama Slow Dance.

2006–present 
Hirosue returned to film and television in 2006 by appearing in three television dramas, a TV movie and a film. In 2007, she co-starred for the third time with Hiroshi Abe (her fellow actor in Dekichatta Kekkon and Haruka Naru Yakusoku) in the film Bubble Fiction: Boom or Bust. She also appeared in two TV movies, Mama ga Ryori o Tsukuru Wake, broadcast by Fuji TV, and Long Wedding Road!, which was broadcast by TBS.  Hirosue also made a guest appearance in the third episode, "Rattles", of the detective series Galileo.

She had a supporting role in NTV's comedy series Yasuko to Kenji in 2008.

She portrayed Mika Kobayashi opposite Masahiro Motoki in the 2008 Japanese film Departures, which won the 81st Academy Awards Best Foreign Language Film.

In 2009, she is starring in the remake of the mystery film Zero Focus and the adaptation to film of the novel Villon's Wife by Osamu Dazai.

She co-starred in the 2010 film Flowers with Yū Aoi, Kyōka Suzuki, Yūko Takeuchi, Rena Tanaka and Yukie Nakama.

Personal life 
She married Okazawa Takahiro in December 2003. The marriage ended in early 2008.
On 9 October 2010 she married Jun Izutsu, a candle artist. They met in Haiti in March 2010 participating in earthquake relief efforts. Her cousin is a former member of the House of Representatives in Japan.

She has three children. She gave birth to her first son in April 2004. On 10 March 2011 she had her second son. On 17 July 2015, she gave birth to her third child, a girl.

Filmography

Film 

 20th Century Nostalgia (1997)
 Poppoya (1999) - Yukiko Sato
 Himitsu (1999) - Monami / Naoko-daughter and Mother
 Zawa-zawa Shimo-Kitazawa (2000) - Flea Market Girl
 Wasabi (2001) - Yumi Yoshimido
 Jam Films (2002) - (segment "Arita")
 Collage of Our Life (2003) - Shizuru Satonaka
 Hana and Alice (2004) - Editor
 Presents Aikagi (2006) - Yukari
 Bubble Fiction: Boom or Bust (2007) - Mayumi Tanaka
 Little DJ (2007) - Tamaki - adult
 Koneko no Namida (2007) - Yuko
 Departures (2008) - Mika Kobayashi
 Goemon (2009) - Chacha
 Villon's Wife (2009) - Akiko
 Zero Focus (2009)
 Flowers (2010) - Kei
 Key of Life (2012) - Kanae Mizushima
 Love: Masao-kun ga Iku! (2012) - Satomi
 Orpheus' Lyre (2013) - Yoko
 Snow on the Blades (2014) - Setsu
 Lingering Spirits (2014) - Yuko Kasahara
 Nutcracker Fantasy (2014)
 Hana's Miso Soup (2015) - Chie Yasutake
 Mixed Doubles (2017) - Yayoi Yoshioka
 Love × Doc (2018) - Reiko
 Life in Overtime (2018)
 We Make Antiques! Kyoto Rendezvous (2020) - Shino
 Step (2020)
 Family Bond (2020)
 The Confidence Man JP: Episode of the Princess (2020)
 The Confidence Man JP: Episode of the Hero (2022)
 The Hound of the Baskervilles: Sherlock the Movie (2022)
 2 Women (2022) - Shōko Shiraki
 Hard Days (2023) - Misako Kudō

Television

Discography

Albums 
 Arigato! (1997)
 Private (1999)

Singles 
 "Maji de Koisuru Gobyōmae" (1997)
 "Daisuki!" (1997)
 "Wind Prism" (1997)
 "Jeans" (1998) (featuring B-side "Private")
 "Summer Sunset" (1998)
 "Tomorrow" (1999)
 "Kajitsu" (2000)

Compilations and live albums 
 Winter Gift 98 (1998)
 RH Singles &... (1999)
 RH Debut Tour 1999 (1999)
 Super Idol Series (Fukada Kyoko vs Hirosue Ryoko) (2000)
 RH Remix (2001)
 Hirosue Ryoko Perfect Collection (2002)

Photobooks 
 R (1996)
 H (1996)
 No Make (1998)
 FLaMme (1998)
 Le Secret (1999)
 Relax (1999)
 Ryoko Hirosue CF Special (1999)
 Happy 20th Birthday (2000)
 Teens 1996–2000 (2000)
 Newyork RH Avenue 2003 (2003)
 Triangle Photographs (2009)

Awards 

|-
| rowspan=4|1998
| 20th Century Nostalgia 
| Awards of the Japanese Academy: Newcomer of the Year
| 
|-
| 20th Century Nostalgia 
| Mainichi Film Concours: Sponichi Grand Prize New Talent Award
| 
|-
| 20th Century Nostalgia 
| Yokohama Film Festival: Best New Talent
| 
|-
| 20th Century Nostalgia 
| Osaka Film Festival: Best New Talent
| 
|-
| 1999
| –
| Nikkan Sports Film Awards: Best New Talent
| 
|-
| rowspan=3|2000
| Himitsu
| Sitges - Catalan International Film Festival: Best Actress
| 
|-
| Himitsu
| Awards of the Japanese Academy: Best Actress
| 
|-
| Poppoya
| Awards of the Japanese Academy: Best Supporting Actress
| 
|-
| rowspan=2|2008
| Departures
| Awards of the Japanese Academy: Best Actress
| 
|-
| Departures
| Yokohama Film Festival: Best Supporting Actress
| 
|-
| 2009
| Zero Focus
| Awards of the Japanese Academy: Best Actress
| 
|-
| 2013
| Key of Life
| Blue Ribbon Awards: Best Supporting Actress
| 
|-
|rowspan=2|2022
| 2 Women and The Hound of the Baskervilles
| Nikkan Sports Film Awards: Best Supporting Actress
| 
|-
|rowspan=2|2 Women
| Hochi Film Awards: Best Supporting Actress
| 
|-
|rowspan=3|2023
| Mainichi Film Awards: Best Supporting Actress
| 
|-
| 2 Women and The Hound of the Baskervilles
| Blue Ribbon Awards: Best Supporting Actress
| 
|-
| 2 Women, The Hound of the Baskervilles and others
| Kinema Junpo Awards: Best Supporting Actress
| 
|-
|}

References

External links 

  
 Ryoko Hirosue on Warner Music Japan 
 
 

1980 births
Living people
People from Kōchi, Kōchi
Japanese child actresses
Japanese idols
FLaMme artists
Japanese women pop singers
Musicians from Kōchi Prefecture
21st-century Japanese singers
21st-century Japanese women singers
Japanese film actresses
Japanese television actresses
People from Kōchi Prefecture